The 18th Avenue Library (formerly the Science and Engineering Library) is a library on the Ohio State University campus, in Columbus, Ohio, United States.

History 
Built to consolidate existing smaller science and engineering libraries, the library's construction began in 1991 after the demolition of the Brown Hall Annex. The library was designed by Philip Johnson as part of a three building project on campus. The newly constructed library opened in January 3rd, 1993. In 2011, Music and dance collections were added to the library's collection which resulted in it being renamed 18th Avenue Library.

References

External links

 
 

Libraries in Ohio
Ohio State University